Sam Azoulay (born 1936) is a Moroccan wrestler. He competed in the men's Greco-Roman welterweight at the 1960 Summer Olympics.

References

External links
 

1936 births
Living people
Moroccan male sport wrestlers
Olympic wrestlers of Morocco
Wrestlers at the 1960 Summer Olympics
Sportspeople from Casablanca
20th-century Moroccan people